Lloró is a municipality and town in the Chocó Department, Colombia. The official record is held by Mawsynram, India. The rainfall data was measured in its Agricultural Farm, managed by the University of Bogotá, between 1952 and 1989. If accurate, that would make it the wettest place in the world. The town is named for Gioró, a pre-Columbian indigenous chief.

An 1853 watercolor by Manuel María Paz portrays two men in straw hats with a female vendor at a liquor stand in Lloró.

Climate
Lloró has a very wet tropical rainforest climate (Af). The town of Lloró itself has only 8000 mm of rain but the farm located to the east of the city has 12,892.4 mm.

Corregimientos

El Cajón
Carmen de Surama
Irabubú
La Playita
San Lorenzo
Sesego
El Tigre
Urabará

See also
 Wettest places on Earth
 Big Bog, Maui
 Cherrapunji
 Mount Waialeale
 Quibdó

References

Municipalities of Chocó Department
Weather extremes of Earth